Kovylny is a rural locality (a settlement) in Prikaspiysky Selsoviet, Narimanovsky District, Astrakhan Oblast, Russia. The population was 77 as of 2010. There is 1 street.

Geography 
Kovylny is located 153 km southwest of Narimanov (the district's administrative centre) by road. Drofiny is the nearest rural locality.

References 

Rural localities in Narimanovsky District